Ngware is a village in Kweneng District of Botswana. It is located 50 km north-east of Letlhakeng. The population of Ngware was 573 in 2001 census.

References

Kweneng District
Villages in Botswana